Martin Válovčan (born 14 May 1993) is a Slovak footballer who currently plays for FC Langenthal as a left winger or forward.

Career

FC ViOn Zlaté Moravce
Válovčan made his professional debut for FC ViOn Zlaté Moravce against Spartak Myjava on 16 July 2016, coming on as substitute for Jozef Rejdovian.

References

External links
 Eurofotbal profile
  
 Futbalnet Profile

1993 births
Living people
Slovak footballers
Slovak expatriate footballers
Association football midfielders
FK Dukla Banská Bystrica players
MŠK Rimavská Sobota players
MFK Tatran Liptovský Mikuláš players
MFK Lokomotíva Zvolen players
FC ViOn Zlaté Moravce players
FK Železiarne Podbrezová players
Slovak Super Liga players
Sportspeople from Zvolen
Slovak expatriate sportspeople in Switzerland
Expatriate footballers in Switzerland